Don Warrington (June 7, 1948 – December 4, 1980) was a running back who played ten seasons in the Canadian Football League for the Edmonton Eskimos. In his career, Warrington was a part of four Grey Cup championship teams. He was nicknamed "Jeep". He played college football for the Simon Fraser Clan.

He suffered fatal injuries in a car accident, which occurred near Sherwood Park, Alberta, on December 2, 1980, nine days after appearing in the Edmonton Eskimos third (of five) consecutive Grey Cups that year. Warrington died two days later at University Hospital in Edmonton. In his memory, the Eskimos wore a patch with 'EE 21' in a circle on their jersey sleeves the following season; the team would win its fourth straight Grey Cup that year.

Warrington's jersey number (21) was unofficially retired by the Eskimos following his death.

References

Sources
 

1948 births
1980 deaths
BC Lions players
Canadian football running backs
Edmonton Elks players
Players of Canadian football from British Columbia
Simon Fraser Clan football players
Simon Fraser University alumni
Sportspeople from Burnaby
Road incident deaths in Canada
Accidental deaths in Alberta